Zunil is a town and municipality in the Quetzaltenango department of Guatemala with a surface area of . The population of the municipality is about 14,000, 100% indigenous. The inhabitants speak Kʼicheʼ and Spanish.
There are thermal baths with volcanic water around the town, for example Fuentes Georginas and Almolonga.

Religion
Zunil possesses active worship of San Simón (also known as Maximón), a life-sized mannequin representing a Maya god, sitting in a wooden throne, which is moved to a different house every year, and many people visit and leave gifts at his shrine.

Namesakes
A crater on Mars, which may be the source of Mars meteorites, is named after the village.

Gallery

Notes

References

External links 

Zunil at Inforpressca
Fuentes Georginas

Municipalities of the Quetzaltenango Department